Viktor Johan Anton Claesson (born 2 January 1992) is a Swedish professional footballer who plays as a winger for the Danish Superliga club Copenhagen and the Sweden national team. He is known for his passing and set piece abilities.

Club career

Early career
Claesson started his career with local club IFK Värnamo. After progressing through the youth ranks, he made his senior debut in 2009 in a Division 1 Södra match. After a breakthrough campaign during the 2011 Superettan season, Claesson join IF Elfsborg in the Allsvenskan, the top division of Swedish football.

Krasnodar
On 25 January 2017, Claesson signed a 3.5-year contract with Russian Premier League team FC Krasnodar. He scored on his debut on 16 February 2017 in a 1–0 Europa League Round of 32 win against Turkish Süper Lig side Fenerbahçe, scoring a header on his first touch in any competitive Krasnodar game in the 4th minute. He was selected by UEFA as "Man of the Match". He continued his form with two goals in a Russian Cup game against FC Ural Sverdlovsk Oblast on 28 February 2017 and a goal against Celta de Vigo in the first leg of Europa League Round of 16 on 9 March 2017.

Claesson missed all of the 2019–20 season with a serious knee injury.

2020–21 season
Out of action for over 14 months, Claesson returned from injury on 18 August 2020, playing the last 15 minutes of Krasnodar's 2–0 home win over Arsenal Tula in the Russian Premier League. On 18 September, he scored his first two goals since his return from injury in a 7–2 thrashing of Khimki. Four days later, Claesson scored from the penalty spot in the club's first-leg play-off round match against PAOK for qualification to the group stage of the UEFA Champions League. Krasnodar would win the second leg against PAOK by the same scoreline and secure progression to the group stage of the Champions League for the first time in the club's history.

2021–22 season
On 3 March 2022, following the Russian invasion of Ukraine, Krasnodar announced that his contract is suspended and he will not train with the team, but the contract is not terminated and remains valid. On 5 March 2022, his contract was terminated and he was released from the club.

Copenhagen
On 30 March 2022, Claesson signed with Copenhagen in Denmark until the end of the season. On 3 April, he scored the winning goal in his debut match for the club after coming on as a substitute in the 61st minute.

On 16 June 2022, Claesson signed an extension with Copenhagen until 2026.

International career
In May 2018, Claesson was named in Sweden’s 23 man squad for the 2018 FIFA World Cup in Russia. He was one of Sweden's main men for the duration of the tournament, in which the Blågult reached the quarterfinals.

In a UEFA Euro 2020 qualifier against Spain on 10 June 2019, Claesson suffered a serious knee injury, rupturing the cruciate knee ligaments, after a clash with Jordi Alba.

He was named in Sweden's UEFA Euro 2020 squad, and appeared in all four games as Sweden was eliminated in the round of 16 by Ukraine. He scored the winning goal in a 3–2 win against Poland in the group stage.

Career statistics

Club

International

Scores and results list Sweden's goal tally first, score column indicates score after each Claesson goal.

Honours
Elfsborg
 Allsvenskan: 2012
 Svenska Cupen: 2013–14

Copenhagen
 Danish Superliga: 2021–22

Sweden
 King's Cup: 2013

Individual
Allsvenskan Top assist provider: 2015
 Swedish Midfielder of the Year: 2018
 Stor Grabb: 2018
Russian Premier League Best Left Winger: 2018–19

References

External links 

 

1992 births
Living people
People from Värnamo Municipality
Swedish footballers
Sweden international footballers
Sweden under-21 international footballers
Sweden youth international footballers
Association football midfielders
Ettan Fotboll players
Superettan players
Allsvenskan players
IFK Värnamo players
IF Elfsborg players
Russian Premier League players
FC Krasnodar players
F.C. Copenhagen players
2018 FIFA World Cup players
UEFA Euro 2020 players
Swedish expatriate footballers
Expatriate footballers in Russia
Swedish expatriate sportspeople in Russia
Expatriate men's footballers in Denmark
Swedish expatriate sportspeople in Denmark
Sportspeople from Jönköping County